Kate Eaves (born 6 May 1968) is a former Welsh rugby union player. She represented  at the 1991 and 1994 Rugby World Cup's.

Biography 
Eaves began playing for the Wasps Ladies in 1988 and captained them between 1988 and 1991. In 1993 she scored two tries in a test match against  and helped her side win 23–0. At the 1994 World Cup, Eaves scored a brace of tries against  in the pool stages to help her side make a comeback from an 8–6 half-time deficit to win 29–8.

References 

Living people
1968 births
Welsh female rugby union players
Wales international rugby union players